Mynampati Bhaskar (1945–2013) was a writer and a journalist from Andhra Pradesh. His works include short stories, novels, news articles, movie reviews and children stories. He was also a cartoonist. Adventure, science fiction, social issues, history, and humor are his primary genres. He wrote thirty novels and more than one hundred short stories. Some of his novels are preserved in Washington Library, Chicago, Illinois.

He died on 4 June 2013 while undergoing treatment in Care Hospital, Hyderabad.

References

External links 
 Personal website of Mynampati Bhaskar

1945 births
2013 deaths
Telugu writers
Indian science fiction writers
People from Prakasam district
Indian male novelists
Writers from Hyderabad, India
Osmania University alumni
20th-century Indian novelists
Novelists from Andhra Pradesh
Indian cartoonists
Journalists from Andhra Pradesh
20th-century Indian male writers